Nicholas Cox (1724–1794) was a military officer in Nova Scotia and later Lt. Governor of de la Gaspesie.  During Father Le Loutre's War, Cox was under the command of Col. Peregrine Lascelles and Lt. Col Robert Monckton of the 47th Regiment of Foot. Cox served as commander at Fort Vieux Logis, after the Siege of Grand Pre and later at Fort Edward, participating in the Bay of Fundy Campaign (1755).  He became a captain on 2 July 1753 and was the longest serving Captain at Fort Edward.   He also was at the Battle of Fort Beausejour and the Siege of Louisbourg (1758).

References 

People from Hants County, Nova Scotia
1724 births
1794 deaths
47th Regiment of Foot officers